The 2011 Lafayette Leopards football team represented Lafayette College in the 2011 NCAA Division I FCS football season. The Leopards were led by 12th year head coach Frank Tavani and played their home games at Fisher Stadium. They are a member of the Patriot League.

The Leopards' season opener at North Dakota State was the furthest west the team has ever traveled and was the squad's first contest played indoors since Lafayette faced Washington & Jefferson at the Atlantic City Boardwalk Hall in 1930.

They finished the season 4–7, 2–4 in Patriot League play to finish in a tie for fifth place.

Schedule

References

Lafayette
Lafayette Leopards football seasons
Lafayette Leopards football